James Edward Palmer-Tomkinson born James Edward Tomkinson (2 December 1879 – 14 November 1961) was an English first-class cricketer.

The son of the politician and landowner James Tomkinson, Palmer-Tomkinson was born at Willington Hall in Willington in December 1879. He was educated at Eton College, before going up to the University of Oxford. He later toured British India with the Oxford University Authentics in 1902–03, making three first-class appearances on the tour against Bombay, the Parsees and the Gentlemen of England. He scored 99 in his three first-class matches, with a high score of 41. He married Marion Lindsay Smith in 1912, and the couple had four children, including the Olympic skier James Algernon Palmer-Tomkinson. He died in November 1961 at Inkpen, Berkshire.

References

External links

1879 births
1961 deaths
People from Cheshire West and Chester
People educated at Eton College
Alumni of the University of Oxford
English cricketers
Oxford University Authentics cricketers
James